On May 30, 2012, a spree shooting occurred in Seattle, Washington. The shootings began with a mass shooting at Café Racer, resulting in the deaths of four patrons and injuring a fifth. Another woman was killed not long after in a carjacking. The shooter, Ian Lee Stawicki, died by suicide the same day.

Shootings
On May 30, 2012, just before 11:00 a.m., Stawicki walked into Café Racer in the University District of Seattle, Washington. The staff there recognized him from previously being thrown out, and reminded him of that. Stawicki lingered for a bit, and then walked near the door. He pulled one of his two pistols, both .45-caliber handguns, and shot his first victim in the back of the head. The man's body blocked the door, taking away an escape route. One man threw a bar stool and used a second to separate himself from Stawicki. The distraction allowed two or three people to escape through the door the shooter had blocked. Stawicki then went near the bar and shot the others execution-style, police say. As he left, Stawicki took a hat from one of the victims. Stawicki killed a total of four patrons at the café and wounded the café's chef.

Half an hour later, he killed another woman in a parking lot next to Town Hall Seattle on First Hill while carjacking her black Mercedes-Benz SUV. Later that afternoon just before 4:00 p.m., he died by suicide on a sidewalk in West Seattle as police closed in. The perpetrator previously owned six handguns (three 9mm handguns and three .45-caliber handguns), including the Remington 1911 R1 pistol he used in the shootings. As a result of the shootings, several schools, including Roosevelt High School and Nathan Eckstein Middle School, were put on lockdown for student safety.

Perpetrator
Ian Lee Stawicki (September 16, 1971 – May 30, 2012) was the sole perpetrator of the shooting. Stawicki had prior contacts with police but a relatively short record. Police say he had charges for domestic violence interference, fourth-degree assault, malicious mischief, and a 1989 charge for unlawfully carrying a weapon. However, court records show only a 1995 case for driving with a suspended license, which resulted in an adverse finding.

During the February 2008 case, police officers were called to the Magnolia home of Stawicki and his then-girlfriend to find the victim with a bloody nose and crying. She told police that he had struck her and destroyed several of her belongings, and that in recent months, he had begun breaking things and flying into rages, according to the police report. Stawicki's father, Walt Stawicki, described his son as a very private person who was "disgruntled" and had been a frequent customer of the coffee shop where his rampage began.

Victims

Dead
Joseph "Meshuguna Joe" Albanese (bassist of MIGHTY SPHINCTER), 52, at Café Racer
Andrew "Schmootzi the Clod" Keriakedes, 49, at Café Racer
Kimberly Lynn Layfield, 36, at Café Racer
Donald Largen, 57, at Café Racer
Gloria Leonidas, 52, on First Hill
Injured
Leonard Meuse, 46, at Café Racer

Aftermath 
Café Racer had a somewhat rocky history after the incident, opening and closing at least twice over the next eight years, before definitively closing during the COVID-19 pandemic in 2020. In its final closing in August 2020, owner Jeff Ramsey announced that the name would live on as a free online music station featuring "music from Washington and primarily Seattle." In 2021, Café Racer reopened in the Capitol Hill neighborhood.

References

2012 active shooter incidents in the United States
Murder–suicides in Washington (state)
Mass murder in 2012
Murder in Washington (state)
2012 murders in the United States
2012 in Washington (state)
2012 in Seattle
2012 mass shootings in the United States
Mass shootings in the United States
Spree shootings in the United States
Crimes in Washington (state)
Attacks in the United States in 2012
May 2012 crimes in the United States
Mass shootings in Washington (state)